The 1957 World Women's Handball Championship took place in Virovitica, PR Croatia and Belgrade, PR Serbia within FPR Yugoslavia in 1957.

Preliminary round

Group A

Group B

Group C

Main round

Group I

Group II

Classification round

Finals

Final standings

Final ranking

References

 

World Handball Championship tournaments
W
W
W
International handball competitions hosted by Croatia
International handball competitions hosted by Serbia
Women's handball in Croatia
Women's handball in Serbia
July 1957 sports events in Europe